Grass Lake is located by Nelson Corner, New York. Fish species present in the lake are northern pike, smallmouth bass, largemouth bass, walleye, yellow perch, tiger muskie, and bluegill. There is a state owned hard surface ramp on the west shore.

References 

Lakes of New York (state)